Rhadinothamnus is a small genus of shrubs in the family Rutaceae. The genus, which is endemic to Western Australia, was formally described in 1971.

Species include:
Rhadinothamnus anceps (DC.) Paul G. Wilson — blister bush
Rhadinothamnus euphemiae  (F. Muell.) Paul G. Wilson
Rhadinothamnus rudis  (Bartl.) Paul G. Wilson

References

External links

Taxa named by Paul G. Wilson
Zanthoxyloideae genera
Zanthoxyloideae